The Boise Historic District in Boise, Idaho, includes late 19th century and early 20th century buildings constructed of brick, sandstone, or wood in an area roughly bounded by Capitol Boulevard, North 5th Street, West Main Street, and West Idaho Street. The district is located within an area known as Old Boise, and contributing properties were constructed 1879–1920.

Partial list of contributing properties

References

External links

 City of Boise: Landmarks
 Old Boise
 Mapping the City: Boise's 1863 Plat
 Idaho State Historical Society

National Register of Historic Places in Boise, Idaho
Buildings and structures in Boise, Idaho
Historic districts on the National Register of Historic Places in Idaho